Scopula chydaea is a moth of the family Geometridae. It was described by Prout in 1938. It is found on Sulawesi.

References

Moths described in 1938
chydaea
Taxa named by Louis Beethoven Prout
Moths of Indonesia